Pueblo is a center of media in south-central Colorado.  The following is a list of media outlets based in the city.

Newspaper 
The Pueblo Chieftain is the city's primary newspaper, published daily. In addition, Colorado State University Pueblo publishes a weekly student newspaper, CSU Pueblo Today.  There is also The Pueblo West View and the PULP News Magazine.

Print
THRIFTY NICKEL of southern Colorado -  TNSOCO is the largest print and online advertising source in southern Colorado; established in 1970. Publishers, Ernie & Paula Montano.

Thrifty Nickel southern Colorado is distributed in the following markets: Colorado Springs, Monument, Black Forest, Woodland Park, Manitou, Fountain/Fort Carson, Pueblo, Pueblo West, Canon City, Penrose, Florence, Salida, Buena Vista, Colorado City, Rye, Westcliffe, La Veta, Walsenburg, Trinidad, Fort Garland, San Luis Valley, Alamosa, Del Norte, Blanca, La Jara, Antonito, Fowler, Ordway, Rocky Ford, La Junta, Lamar and Las Animas.

Radio
The Pueblo radio market includes all of Pueblo County. In its Fall 2013 ranking of radio markets by population, Arbitron ranked the Pueblo market 238th in the United States. Due to Pueblo's proximity to Colorado Springs, local listeners can also receive the signal of most radio stations broadcasting from the Colorado Springs radio market.

The following is a list of radio stations that broadcast from and/or licensed to Pueblo.

AM

FM

Television
Pueblo is in the Colorado Springs television market.

The following is a list of television stations that broadcast from and/or are licensed to Pueblo.

References

Pueblo
Pueblo, Colorado